Harold Langley may refer to:

Harold D. Langley, American historian
Harold Langley (athlete),  British athlete

See also
Harry Langley, architect